This is the list of presidents of Basilicata since 1970.
Elected by the Regional Council (1970–1995)

Directly-elected presidents (since 1995)

Presidents of Basilicata
Politics of Basilicata
Basilicata